Supergame is a role-playing game originally published by DAG Productions in 1980, and now published by Precis Intermedia.

Description
Supergame is a superhero system featuring "build-it-yourself" character construction, with superpowers, rules for flying and magic, plus a combat system, armor and weapons, scenario suggestions, and campaign guidelines.

Publication history
Supergame was designed by Jay Hartlove and Aimee Karklyn, and was published by DAG Productions in 1980 as a 64-page book. The second edition was published in 1982 as a 40-page book featuring a color cover.

The first and second editions are now published as a single volume by Precis Intermedia, with a third edition also available.

Reception
Lawrence Schick describes the system as "Undistinguished".

References

Role-playing games introduced in 1980
Superhero role-playing games